John Marshall Birthplace Park is a small park located in the historic Germantown area in southern Fauquier County, Virginia.  The park provides access to a dedication monument at or near the birthplace of John Marshall.

Description

The park consists of parking and picnic areas on Germantown Road in Midland, Virginia, a walking trail to the birthplace monument and the monument near the site of John Marshall's birth with an adjacent picnic shelter.  Interpretive signs near the park entrance and trail head give a brief educational description of John Marshall's life.

The walking trail follows the path of a small stream for approximately half a mile (.8 km) to the monument near the site of the residence where Marshall was born.

History
Thomas Marshall, John Marshall's father, moved to Germantown with his new wife in 1754.  John Marshall was born the following year in a substantial -story structure described as "similar to the 1724 Tilman Weaver house" rather than a log cabin.

A marker was erected at the home site by the Marshall chapter of the Phi Delta Phi legal fraternity at George Washington University in 1902.  That marker was enclosed by a larger monument in 1928.  John Marshall Birthplace Park was Fauquier County's first public park.  The  park was dedicated on June 8, 1978.

The plaque on the Marshall birthplace monument states, "Near this spot on September 4, 1755, was born John Marshall".  The location of the marker and monument were based on oral history so the location of the house was in doubt.  Researchers from the William and Mary Center for Archaeological Research, College of William and Mary, conducted background research and a limited on-site survey and testing in July 2005.  Eighteenth-century domestic artifacts found at the site and background research support the site as the likely location of the dwelling of the Marshall family at the time of John Marshall's birth.

Birding and wildlife
The trail to the monument is listed as a part of Virginia's birding and wildlife trail system.  The park is notable for the presence of tawny emperor and Eastern tiger swallowtail butterflies and a variety of resident and migratory birds that may be observed along the trail and adjoining agricultural fields.

Notes

References

Parks in Fauquier County, Virginia
Monuments and memorials in Virginia
Protected areas established in 1978
1978 establishments in Virginia
Birthplace Park
Homes of United States Founding Fathers